NoHo or Noho may refer to:

Places
 NoHo (Hong Kong), a neighborhood north of Hollywood Road in Hong Kong
 NoHo, Manhattan, a neighborhood in New York City "North of Houston" Street
 NoHo Arts District, Los Angeles, California
 North Hollywood, Los Angeles, California
 Northampton, Massachusetts

Structures
 NoHo Square, a planned development on the site of the former Middlesex Hospital, London, abandoned in 2008
 Pforzheimer House, formerly North House, a dormitory at Harvard University